Elimbah railway station is located on the North Coast line in Queensland, Australia. It serves the town of Elimbah in the Moreton Bay Region.

History
Elimbah station was originally a single platform with a crossing loop. As part of the construction of a new 14 kilometre alignment for the North Coast line from Caboolture to Beerburrum, a new station was built immediately to the east, opening on 14 April 2009.

Services
Elimbah is serviced by City network services to Brisbane, Nambour and Gympie North. To relieve congestion on the single track North Coast line north of Beerburrum, the rail service is supplemented by a bus service operated by Kangaroo Bus Lines on weekdays between Caboolture and Nambour as route 649.

Services by platform

Future
In 2016 construction commenced on stabling facilities a few kilometres south of the station as part of the New Generation Rollingstock project.

References

External links

Elimbah station Queensland Rail
Elimbah station Queensland's Railways on the Internet

North Coast railway line, Queensland
Railway stations in Moreton Bay Region